Russell Terrell Wilson was a mathematics professor and an American football, basketball and baseball coach. He was a 1906 graduate of Earlham College in Richmond, Indiana. He was a mathematics professor at the University of Southern California beginning in 1912.

Wilson served as the head football coach at Whittier College in Whittier, California and Saint Mary's College of California between 1912 and 1919. Beginning in 1916, Wilson also served as a basketball and baseball coach at Stanford University.

References

Year of birth missing
Year of death missing
Earlham Quakers football players
Saint Mary's Gaels football coaches
Stanford Cardinal baseball coaches
Stanford Cardinal men's basketball coaches
Whittier Poets football coaches
University of Southern California faculty